Halli Krzyzaniak (born February 4, 1995) is a Canadian women's ice hockey player, currently playing for the Calgary section of the PWHPA. She made her debut with the Canada women's national ice hockey team at the 2014 4 Nations Cup.

Playing career
Krzyzaniak moved to Kelowna, British Columbia, at age 13 to attend the Pursuit of Excellence Hockey Academy. She represented Team Manitoba at the 2011 Canada Winter Games women's ice hockey tournament. She travelled to Bratislava, Slovakia to participate in the 2011 IIHF High Performance Women's Camp from July 4–12. During the 2011–12 Canada women's national ice hockey team season, she was a member of the Canadian National Under 18 team that participated in a three-game series vs. the US in August 2011.

NCAA
In autumn 2013, she joined the University of North Dakota women's ice hockey program. She would earn one of the assists on the game-winning goal scored by Susanna Tapani which snapped the Minnesota Golden Gophers 62-game win streak on November 17, 2013.

Professional
Following her participation at Hockey Canada's Centralization Camp in the autumn of 2017, Krzyzaniak played with Djurgårdens IF of the Swedish Women's Hockey League, recording one assist in five regular season games and two assists in four playoff games. In 2018, Krzyzaniak was drafted fourth overall by the Calgary Inferno in the 2018 CWHL Draft.

Career statistics

Personal
Her uncle, Rick Blight played for the Vancouver Canucks.

References

External links

1995 births
Canadian women's ice hockey defencemen
Clarkson Cup champions
Ice hockey people from Manitoba
Living people
North Dakota Fighting Hawks women's ice hockey players
Sportspeople from Brandon, Manitoba
Canadian expatriate ice hockey players in the United States
Professional Women's Hockey Players Association players
Djurgårdens IF Hockey players
Calgary Inferno players